Gemma C. Solomon (born 27 October 1980) is an Australian chemist who is a professor at the Nanoscience Centre in the University of Copenhagen. She serves as Deputy Editor of ACS Physical Chemistry Au. Her research considers quantum interference and molecular electronics.

Early life and education 
Solomon was an undergraduate student at the University of Western Australia, where she studied chemical physics. She moved to the University of Sydney, where she completed a second bachelor's degree and a doctorate in chemistry. Her research considered the conductance of single molecules. She joined Northwestern University as a postdoctoral fellow in 2006, where she worked with Mark Ratner.

Research and career 
In 2010, Solomon joined the faculty at the University of Copenhagen, when she was awarded a starter grant from the European Research Council. Her research considers the development of novel materials for molecular electronics. In 2018, Solomon designed the most highly insulating molecule ever reported, which transformed understanding of the limits of electronic insulation. Later that year she was made a Full Professor at the university.

Awards and honours 
 2014 Torkil Holm Prize
 2016 Uppsala University Löwdin Lectureship
 2019 Royal Danish Academy of Sciences and Letters Silver Medal
 2021 Ministry of Higher Education and Science’s EliteForsk Prize

Selected publications

Personal life 
Solomon is married to Allan Godsk Larsen, with whom she has three children.

References 

1980 births
Living people
University of Western Australia alumni
University of Sydney alumni
Northwestern University faculty
Academic staff of the University of Copenhagen